The HTR-PM (球床模块式高温气冷堆核电站) is a small modular nuclear reactor in China.
It is the world’s first demonstrator of a high-temperature gas-cooled (HTGR) pebble-bed generation IV reactor based on the HTR-10. The reactor unit has a thermal capacity of 250 MW, and two reactors are connected to a single steam turbine to generate 210 MW of electricity. Its role is to replace coal-fired power plants in China's interior, in line with the country's plan to reach carbon neutrality by 2060.

History 
The HTR-PM is a high-temperature gas-cooled reactor (HTGR) and is based on the HTR-10 prototype reactor. The demonstration project for the High-Temperature gas-cooled Reactor Pebble-bed Module (HTR-PM) was launched in 2001. Work on the first demonstration power plant, composed of two reactors driving a single steam turbine, began in December 2012 in Shidao Bay Nuclear Power Plant in Shandong province. 
The pressure vessels of the two reactors were installed in 2016. The steam generator shell, hot gas duct shell and reactor pressure vessel shell of the first reactor in the HTR-PM demonstration project were successfully paired on 28 April 2020, paving the way for the installation of the main helium fan. 

The cold functional tests of the HTR-PM were successfully completed between October and November 2020. The air and helium mixture was pressurized to a maximum of 8.9 MPa in the primary coolant loop. Following the cold functional tests, the hot tests were performed in three stages: vacuum dehumidification, heating and dehumidification and the hot functional tests. The hot tests began in December 2020, and would continue before bringing the reactor online. 
On 12 September 2021, the first of two reactors achieved criticality. On 11 November 2021, reactor two achieved first criticality. 
On 20 December 2021, reactor one was connected to the state power grid and began producing power. On 9 December 2022, the HTR-PM project demonstrated it had reached "initial full power".

Concerns 
A 2018 paper by Rainer Moormann and others published in the journal Joule recommended additional safety measures for this type of reactor based on experiences with the German AVR reactor.

See also
 Nuclear power in China

References

Nuclear technology in China
Small modular reactor
Pebble bed reactors